
The following is a list of episodes of Wait Wait... Don't Tell Me!, NPR's news panel game, that aired during 2005.  All episodes, unless otherwise noted, feature Peter Sagal as host and Carl Kasell as announcer/scorekeeper, and originate from the Chase Bank Auditorium in Chicago.  Dates indicated are the episodes' original Saturday air dates.  Job titles and backgrounds of the guests reflect their status at the time of their appearance.

January

February

March

April

May

June

July

August

September

October

November

December

External links
Wait Wait... Don't Tell Me! Archives on NPR.org
WWDT.Me, an unofficial Wait Wait historical site

Wait Wait... Don't Tell Me!
Wait Wait Don't Tell Me
Wait Wait Don't Tell Me